Birn or variants may refer to:

BIRN  
Biomedical Informatics Research Network (BIRN), a geographically distributed virtual community of shared resources relating to diagnosis and treatment of disease
Balkan Investigative Reporting Network
Berklee College of Music Internet Radio Network

Birn or Birns 
Alex Birns (born 1907–1975), Jewish American mobster
Jack Birns (born 1919-2008), American photographer
Jerry Birn (born 1923-2009), American television writer
Laura Birn (born 1981), Finnish actress
Laura Bryan Birn (born 1965), American actress

Other uses
Dál Birn
Lóegaire Birn Búadach, Óengus Osrithe's son
Nem Moccu Birn (died 654), Irish saint